Lojpur is a Serbian surname. Notable people with the surname include:

Marija Lojpur (born 1983), Serbian handball player
Mile Lojpur (1930–2005), Yugoslav and Serbian rock musician

Serbian surnames